Bălăcița is a commune located in Mehedinți County, Romania. It is composed of three villages: Bălăcița, Dobra and Gvardinița. It is situated in the historical region of Oltenia.

References

Communes in Mehedinți County
Localities in Oltenia